The Tournelon Blanc is a mountain of the Swiss Pennine Alps, overlooking the lake of Mauvoisin in the canton of Valais. It belongs to the Grand Combin massif and lies east of the Corbassière Glacier.

References

External links
Tournelon Blanc on Hikr

Mountains of the Alps
Alpine three-thousanders
Mountains of Switzerland
Mountains of Valais